Endoclita is a genus of moths of the family Hepialidae. There are 60 described species found in eastern and southeast Asia and the Indian subcontinent.

Species 
Endoclita aboe – India
Endoclita absurdus – China
Endoclita actinidae – China (Fujian)
Endoclita aikasama – Java
Endoclita albofasciatus – India
Endoclita anhuiensis – China (Anhui)
Endoclita annae – China
Endoclita aroura – Sumatra
Food plant: Tectona
Endoclita auratus – Myanmar
Recorded food plants: Alnus, Cryptomeria, Eucalyptus
Endoclita aurifer – Java
Endoclita broma – Java
Endoclita buettneria – Myanmar
Food plant: Byttneria
Endoclita chalybeatus – India
Recorded food plants: Gmelina, Tectona, Theobroma
Endoclita coomani – Vietnam
Endoclita crinilimbata – China
Endoclita chrysoptera – India
Endoclita damor – India, Himalaya
Recorded food plants: Albizia, Altingia, Cinchona, Coffea, Erythrina, Eugenia, Glochidion, Manglietia, Nyssa, Schima, Tectona, Tetradium, Theobroma
Endoclita davidi – China
Endoclita excrescens – Japan, Russia (far east) – a pest of tobacco
Recorded food plants: Castanea, Nicotiana, Paulownia, Quercus, Raphanus
Endoclita fijianodus – China (Fujian)
Endoclita gmelina – Myanmar
Recorded food plants: Gmelina, Tectona
Endoclita hoenei – China
Endoclita hosei – Borneo
Recorded food plants: Elettaria, Eucalyptus, Theobroma
Endoclita ijereja – Borneo
Endoclita inouei – Taiwan
Endoclita javaensis – Java
Endoclita jianglingensis – China (Hubei)
Endoclita jingdongensis – China (Yunnan)
Endoclita kara – Java
Endoclita magnus – India
Endoclita malabaricus – India
Endoclita marginenotatus – China
Endoclita metallica
Endoclita microscripta – India
Endoclita minanus – China (Fujian)
Endoclita mingiganteus –
Endoclita niger – Java
Endoclita nodus
Endoclita paraja – Borneo
Endoclita punctimargo – Sikkim
Recorded food plants: Camellia, Cryptomeria
Endoclita purpurescens – Sri Lanka
Recorded food plants: Camellia, Cinchona
Endoclita raapi – Nias
Endoclita rustica – India
Endoclita salsettensis – India
Endoclita salvazi – Laos
Endoclita sericeus – Java
Recorded food plants: Albizia, Camellia, Cinchona, Crotalaria, Manihot, Tectona, Theobroma
Endoclita sibelae – Bacan
Endoclita signifer – India, China (Hunan)
Recorded food plants: Clerodendrum, Gmelina, Tectona, Vitis
Endoclita sinensis – China, Korea, Taiwan
Recorded food plants: Castanea, Quercus
Endoclita strobilanthes – India
Endoclita taranu – Sumatra
Endoclita topeza – Laos
Endoclita tosa – Java
Endoclita undulifer – India
Recorded food plants: Alnus, Byttneria, Callicarpa, Cryptomeria, Eucalyptus, Gmelina
Endoclita viridis – India
Endoclita warawita – Borneo
Endoclita williamsi – Philippines
Endoclita xizangensis – China (Hunan)
Endoclita yunnanensis – China (Yunnan)

References

External links
Hepialidae genera

Hepialidae
Exoporia genera
Taxa named by Baron Cajetan von Felder